Plans for the Albino Rock Lighthouse were published in 1940 with construction scheduled to begin the same year. The light characteristic was white with three flashes every 20 seconds (Fl.W.20s), 15,000 candlepower, and  visibility.  

In 2012, after showing significant cracking and deterioration, the tower was completely demolished down to the concrete base and replaced with a fiberglass hexagonal tower. The former Fresnel lens is on display at the Townsville Maritime Museum.

Notes 

Lighthouses completed in 1940
Lighthouses in Queensland
Buildings and structures in North Queensland